Lars Taylor-Tatsuji Nootbaar (Enokida Tatsuji, born September 8, 1997) is a Japanese-American baseball player who plays as an outfielder for the St. Louis Cardinals of Major League Baseball and the Japan national team. 

Born and raised in El Segundo, California, Nootbaar played three seasons of college baseball at the University of Southern California. The Cardinals selected him in the eighth round of the 2018 MLB draft, and he was in their minor league system for four seasons before making his MLB debut in 2021.

Early life and amateur career
Nootbaar was born to an American father of Dutch, English and German descent, Charlie Nootbaar, and a Japanese mother, Kumi Enokida. Nootbaar grew up in El Segundo, California. 

He was a batboy, participating with Japanese high school players in their visit to US for series of exhibition matches in 2006, stretching and playing catch with the team, also sharing meals with the team, which included future MLB player Masahiro Tanaka and Japanese high school pitching phenom, Yuki Saito. This experience would later be influential to accepting the offer to join the Japanese National Team for the 2023 World Baseball Classic.

He later attended El Segundo High School, where he played baseball and football. He was a three-time League MVP in baseball and twice in football as the Eagles' starting quarterback. He committed to play college baseball at the University of Southern California (USC) and was recruited to play college football by UC Davis and Fordham.

Nootbaar was a three-year starter for the USC Trojans, where his older brother Nigel had played. He was named All-Pac-12 Conference as a sophomore after hitting .313 with 34 RBIs, 33 runs scored, and seven home runs. Following the season, he played collegiate summer baseball with the Orleans Firebirds of the Cape Cod Baseball League. As a junior, Nootbaar batted .249 with six home runs and 24 RBIs.

Professional career
The St. Louis Cardinals selected Nootbaar in the eighth round of the 2018 Major League Baseball draft. After signing with the team, he was assigned to the State College Spikes of the Class A Short Season New York–Penn League, where he set a team record with seven RBIs in one game. For the season, he hit .227 with two home runs and 26 RBIs over 56 games. Nootbaar began the 2019 season with the Class A Peoria Chiefs of the Midwest League before being promoted to the Class A-Advanced Palm Beach Cardinals of the Florida State League. He was promoted a second time to the Springfield Cardinals of the Class AA Texas League. Over 101 games between the three clubs, he batted .264 with seven home runs and 38 RBIs. In 2020, the minor league season was cancelled by the COVID-19 pandemic.

Nootbaar began the 2021 season at the Cardinals' alternate training site before being reassigned to the Triple-A East Memphis Redbirds. He was placed on the injured list with a hand injury on May 28, and was activated on June 14.

On June 22, 2021, Nootbaar was selected to the 40-man roster and promoted to the major leagues for the first time. At the time of his promotion, he was slashing .329/.430/.557 with five home runs and 17 RBIs over 22 games. He made his MLB debut that day as the starting left fielder against the Detroit Tigers. The following day, Nootbaar recorded his first career hit, a triple. He hit his first career home run as a pinch-hitter off J.T. Brubaker in a 7–6 win over the Pittsburgh Pirates on August 12, 2021. Nootbaar hit another pinch-hit home run the next day in a 6–0 victory over the Kansas City Royals. On August 25, 2021, Nootbaar got his first career walk-off hit, a single in the 10th inning against Tigers relief pitcher Michael Fulmer. Nootbaar finished the 2021 season slashing .239/.317/.422 with five home runs and 15 RBIs over 109 at-bats. He was selected to play in the Arizona Fall League for the Glendale Desert Dogs after the season.  

Nootbaar entered the 2022 season as the Cardinals' fourth outfielder before eventually moving into a starting role after injuries and positive play. Over 108 games and 290 at-bats for St. Louis, he slashed .228/.340/.448 with 14 home runs, forty RBIs, and 16 doubles.

In 2023 Nootbaar represented Japan in the World Baseball Classic, becoming the first player to represent Japan in the competition despite not having been born in the country.

Personal life
Nootbaar's father, who is American of Dutch, English and German descent, met his mother, who is Japanese, while they were students at Cal Poly San Luis Obispo. His older brother, Nigel, was a pitcher at USC and played professionally in the Baltimore Orioles system. Nootbaar is the great-grandson of businessman and philanthropist Herbert Nootbaar, an early benefactor of Honkbal Hoofdklasse.

During the 2022 season, Nootbaar became a fan favorite among Cardinals fans, often being greeted with "Nooooot!" when batting or making a defensive play.

References

External links

USC Trojans bio

1997 births
Living people
American baseball players of Japanese descent
American people of Dutch descent
Baseball players from California
El Segundo High School alumni
Major League Baseball outfielders
Memphis Redbirds players
Orleans Firebirds players
Palm Beach Cardinals players
People from El Segundo, California
Peoria Chiefs players
Springfield Cardinals players
St. Louis Cardinals players
State College Spikes players
Glendale Desert Dogs players
USC Trojans baseball players
La Crosse Loggers players
American people of German descent
2023 World Baseball Classic players